The Curse of Silence is a 1922 German silent drama film directed by Felix Basch and starring Hermann Thimig and Arnold Korff. The film's sets were designed by the art director Hans Sohnle.

Cast
In alphabetical order
Felix Basch
Gretl Basch
Ernst Gronau
Arnold Korff
Sophie Pagay
Maria Peterson
Hermann Picha
Emil Rameau
Mizzi Schütz
Lotte Stein
Grete Steinlen
Hermann Thimig

References

External links

Films of the Weimar Republic
Films directed by Felix Basch
German silent feature films
German black-and-white films
UFA GmbH films
German drama films
1922 drama films
Silent drama films
1920s German films
1920s German-language films